Wuhanlinigobius is a genus of gobies native to mangrove swamps of eastern Asia.

Etymology
This genus was named to honor the Chinese ichthyologist Dr. Wu Han-Lin who contributed greatly to the study of gobioid fishes of China.

Species
There are currently 2 recognized species in this genus:
 Wuhanlinigobius malayensis S. P. Huang, Jaafar & I. S. Chen, 2014 
 Wuhanlinigobius polylepis H. L. Wu & Y. Ni, 1985

References

Gobiidae